is a Japanese band composed of the singer and songwriter  and the musical composer . The band's name, "Minawo", is a portmanteau of the given names of the bandmates, Minako, and Mitsuwo. Minawo is known in anime circles for performing the ending themes to both D.N.Angel and Melody of Oblivion.

Minawo was formed in 1999 after Matsuura and Yamaguchi met in a club while both were attending University of Kitakyushu.

Discography 
 自主製作 (jishu seisaku, literally, independent production) (demo) (1999)
 プラスチックワールド (purasutikku wārudo, plastic world) mini album, (2001)
 mon・mon, (2002)
 あしあと (ashiato, footprints), (2004)
 VALB NEXT, (2004)
 あくび工房 (akubi kōbō, yawn workshop) mini album (2007)

Singles 
 眠り (nemuri, literally, sleep), (2001)
 GROOVE ROCK vol. 1, (2002)
 やさしい午後 (yasashii gogo, gentle afternoon) - D.N.Angel, ending theme 1. (2003)
 はじまりの日 (hajimari no hi, the day it begins) - D.N.Angel, ending theme 2. (2003)
 てのひらの光 (tenohira no hikari, palm of light) - Melody of Oblivion ending theme. (2004)
 ピアノ楽譜  (piano gakufu, piano score) 2004

Compilations 
 D.N.Angel Vocal Collection (2003)
 Melody of Oblivion OST (2004)

References

External links 
 

Japanese pop music groups
Shibuya-kei musicians
Rock music duos
Musical groups from Fukuoka Prefecture